Al Yarmouk University College is a private Iraqi university established in 1996 in Diyala and the Medical Departments lie in Baghdad, Iraq.

Faculties 

 Dentistry
 Pharmacy
 Computer Engineering Techniques
 Computer Science
 Pathological Analysis Techniques 
 English Language
 Arabic Language
 Law

See also 
 List of universities in Iraq

External links 
 Al-Yarmouk University College website
 https://www.yu.edu.jo/en/
 https://www.linkedin.com/company/al-yarmouk-university-college

Yarmouk
Educational institutions established in 1996
1996 establishments in Iraq